Sleepwalkers (also known as Stephen King's Sleepwalkers) is a 1992 American horror film written by Stephen King and directed by Mick Garris. The film stars Brian Krause, Mädchen Amick and Alice Krige. The film revolves around the last two survivors of a vampiric shapeshifting species that feed on the life force of human female virgins. It was the first time King wrote a screenplay intended for the screen first, rather than adapting one of his already-existing novels or stories.

Plot

Charles Brady and his mother/lover Mary are sleepwalkers, nomadic shapeshifting energy vampires who feed off the lifeforce of virgin women. Though they normally maintain a human form, they can transform into human-sized bipedal werecats, their natural form, at will. They have powers of both telekinesis and illusion. Domestic cats are their only weakness, and the two species are mutually hostile. Cats see through their illusions and violently attack them, inflicting severe to fatal wounds on them with their claws and teeth.

Charles and Mary live in Travis, a small Indiana town, having recently fled Bodega Bay, California after draining and killing a young girl there. Charles attends the local high school, and meets Tanya Robertson in his creative writing class. Charles feigns romantic interest in Tanya in order to take her lifeforce for himself and his starving mother. Their teacher, Mr. Fallows, is suspicious about Charles and tells him that his older high school certificates were fakes; he also physically assaults Charles, but Charles kills him.

On their first date, at a picnic at a nearby cemetery, Charles attempts to drain Tanya's lifeforce while kissing her. Tanya tries frantically to ward off Charles by bashing his head with her camera, scratching his face, and plunging a corkscrew into his left eye, though nothing she does seems to cause Charles more than temporary discomfort.

Deputy Sheriff Andy Simpson is driving by the cemetery. When Tanya flees to him for help, Charles kills Simpson. When Charles resumes feeding off Tanya, the deputy's cat, Clovis, enraged by his master’s death, violently scratches him in the face and chest. Mortally wounded, Charles staggers back home to his mother, who is able to make both of them invisible, and thus keep Charles from being arrested when the police storm their house. Clovis and a small number of other cats begin to gather outside, only kept at bay by the leghold traps the Sleepwalkers have set.

Knowing that the only way for her dying son to survive is to feed, Mary attacks the Robertson household, killing several deputies and state troopers and severely wounding Tanya's parents. She kidnaps Tanya and takes her back to her house. Charles is near death, but Mary revives him, and Charles makes a final attempt to drain Tanya's life force. However, Tanya plunges her fingers into his eyes, killing him. Tanya escapes with the help of the sheriff, whom Mary later impales on the picket fence surrounding the house. The cats that have been gathering around their house, led by Clovis, jump on Mary and claw and bite her until she bursts into flames and dies. Tanya hugs Clovis, her savior, as the other cats depart, leaving Mary's body lying ablaze on her former driveway.

Cast

Production 
Sleepwalkers was the first film written by King to not be based on one of his preexisting works. Columbia Pictures initially approached Rupert Wainwright to direct, but at King's insistence Columbia offered the film to Mick Garris, who had previously directed the horror films Critters 2: The Main Course and Psycho IV: The Beginning. The film was shot in Franklin Canyon Park in Los Angeles, California.

Garris said there were a couple of ideas he put into the film that hadn't been in King's original script. One is the introduction and title sequence from that page in the "Book of Arcane Knowledge" (which he invented) to give it a little backstory. The other was the scene where the Sleepwalkers are making love. Garris said this sex scene was so explicit he had to cut it to avoid an X-rating.

Soundtrack
The original music score was composed by Nicholas Pike.

(Side 2 of the cassette begins at track 9)

Reception
On review aggregator Rotten Tomatoes, the film has an approval rating of 33% based on 18 reviews, giving it an average rating of 4.7/10. On Metacritic the film has a score of 38% based on reviews from 12 critics, indicating "generally unfavorable reviews". Audiences polled by CinemaScore gave the film an average grade of "C+" on an A+ to F scale.

Variety called it "an idiotic horror potboiler".
British horror critic Alan Jones gave the film a scathing review in the Radio Times, saying that "Garris tries to inject life into the pathetic script... but this underdeveloped material is so poor he's constantly fighting a losing battle. There's little to engage the attention in an idiotic potboiler off the creaky King conveyor belt. From the daft prologue set in Bodega Bay where Hitchcock filmed The Birds to the soggy moggy climax, this is absurdly unscary and confusingly dull." In Horror Films FAQ: All That's Left to Know About Slashers, Vampires, Zombies, Aliens, and More, John Kenneth Muir praised the first half of the film, stating: "Sleepwalkers starts out in fine form, as a serious, grim, involving horror film about the last two survivors of a species doing what they must to survive, Krige is incredibly sensual as the half-crazed mother who must be 'fed' through the act of sexual intercourse with her son." He then says that the latter half of the film "devolves into a campy disaster."

Proposed sequel
In April 2020, on his Post Mortem podcast during a listener Q&A session with Joe Russo, Garris confirmed that there was discussion from Columbia Pictures about a sequel, saying in full, "There was a little bit of talk. I mean, the movie was successful, it was the #1 movie the week that it came out. I never heard the studio talk about it, but Tabitha King, Stephen King's wife, actually wrote a treatment for a sequel to Sleepwalkers that involved a women's basketball team somehow. I'm not sure how, I never read it, but King was very excited that Tabby came up with this. But it was a sequel that nobody at the studio gave a shit about. You know, they liked the money that Sleepwalkers made, but it was not a prestige release by any means, so they never even thought about Sleepwalkers after." Both Garris and Russo then discussed a potential reboot, with Garris expressing surprise that there was seemingly no interest, with Russo admitting that "We had a very flirtatious conversation with a production company about a year ago, maybe. It was nothing more than flirting."

See also
 Vampire film

References

External links
 
 
 

1992 films
1992 horror films
1992 fantasy films
1990s monster movies
American dark fantasy films
American monster movies
Columbia Pictures films
Films about cats
Films about invisibility
Films about shapeshifting
Films about telekinesis
Films directed by Mick Garris
Films scored by Nicholas Pike
Films set in Indiana
Films shot in Los Angeles
Films with screenplays by Stephen King
Human-derived fictional species
Incest in film
American vampire films
Films set in a movie theatre
Films about mother–son relationships
1990s English-language films
1990s American films